Bhola District is an administrative district (zila) in south-central Bangladesh, which includes Bhola Island, the largest island of  Bangladesh. It is located in the Barisal Division and has an area of 3403.48 km2. It is bounded by Lakshmipur and Barisal District to the north, the Bay of Bengal to the south, by Lakshmipur and Noakhali districts, the (lower) Meghna river and Shahbazpur Channel to the east, and by Patuakhali District and the Tetulia river to the west. About  natural gas has been found at Kachia in Bhola which is being used to run a power station.

History 

The previous name of Bhola district is Ashutosh. J. C. Jack stated in his "Bakerganj Gazetier" that the island started creating in 1235 and cultivation in this area started in 1300. In 1500, Portuguese and Mog pirates established their bases in this island. The Arakan and Mog pirates established their bases in the southern part of Shahbajpur also.

Shahbajpur was a part of Bakerganj district till 1822. At the beginning of 19th century, it became difficult to connect to the southern Shahjadpur from the district headquarter due to the expansion of Meghna River. Government then decided to include south Shahbajpur and Hatia in Noakhali District. Bhola was included in Noakhali till 1869. In 1869, it was included in Barisal District as a sub-division. In 1876, the administrative headquarter was moved from Daulatkhan to Bhola. In 1984, it was established as a district.

Etymology 
The canal situated in the Bhola Sadar was very wide in ancient times. The canal was known as Betua river. People used boat to cross the river. There was a very old boatman who used to cross the river daily. His name was Bhola Gazi Patni. The name of the district is derived from the name of this famous boatman, Bhola Gazi. The other sub-districts of this districts are also named according to the names of famous persons as well.

Geography
Bhola is a delta island. There are two rivers in this district which are Meghna and Tetulia. Meghna is in east and north side of the district and Tetulia is in the west side. Bay of Bengal is in the south of Bhola district.

Islands
 Bhola Island
 Manpura Island
 Dhal Char
 Char Kukri Mukri
 Char Jahiruddin
 Char Nizam
 Char nazeur Rahaman

Administration
There are five municipalities, 7 sub-districts, 9 thanas, 66 unions and 473 villages in this district.

Subdistricts
Bhola district comprises the following upazilas:

Demographics 

According to the 2011 Bangladesh census, Bhola district had a population of 1,776,795, of which 884,069 are males and 892,726 are females. 1,533,478 (86.31%) are rural and 243,317 (13.69%) are urban. The literacy rate was 43.24%: 43.59% for males and 42.91% for females.

The overwhelming majority of residents are Muslims and there are 2391 mosques, 130 temples and 14 church in this district. The Hindu population has continuously reduced in number from 1991 onwards, when it hit a high of 96,005 people, and stands at less than 61,162 people as of 2011. The district has had the sharpest decline in Hindu population out of all districts in Bangladesh.

Economy
80% of the total people living here are fisherman.  Main source of income of this district are: Agriculture 63.64%, non-agricultural labourer 4.95%, industry 0.50%, commerce 12.67%, transport and communication 2.47%, service 5.74%, construction 1.55%, religious service 0.35%, rent and remittance 0.44% and others 7.69%. There is no major industry in this district due to its geographical location. In recent times, small factories like shoe, plastics, wax, tar etc. have been established here.

Education
The literacy rate of Bhola district is 67.12% (according to bangladesh.gov.bd). The literacy rate among the male population is 67.03% and the female population is 67.20%. There are 3 government and 34 non-government colleges, 6 government and 174 non-government high schools, 84 junior high schools, one PTI, one VTI, 9 technical schools, 922 government primary schools, and 32 community primary schools in Bhola. There are 103 Kowmi madrasa, 460 ebtedai madrasa, 171 dakhil madrasa, 28 alim madrasa, 29 fazil madrasa and 5 kamil madrasa in Bhola. Notable schools and colleges are:

Colleges
 Bhola Govt. College
 Charfassion Govt. College.
 Govt. Fazilatunnesa Women's College
 Shahabajpur Govt. College
 Daulatkhan Govt. Abu Abdullah College

Colleges Polytechnic
Bhola Polytechnic Institute
 Bhola Govt. Technical School & College

Schools
 Bhola Girls High School
 Bhola Govt. High School
 Daulatkhan Govt.High School
 Daulatkhan Govt. Girls High School

Health 
There is 1 modern government hospital, 6 government health complexes, 1 Tuberculosis clinic, 1 mother and child care, 1 diabetic hospital, 276 satellite clinics and 2 government child care in this district.

Transportation 
There is no railways and airport in this district and no direct connection to the capital by road. Waterways are the main medium of transportation. Launch, steamer and sheep are used for transportation. Bhola is 195 km away from Dhaka by waterways and 247 km away by road. Total area of rivers is 1133.46 km2. Total length of road is 3893.65 km, concrete road is 3001.8 km and dirt road is 899.85 km.

Major launch services are M.V Greenline 1&2 M.V Bhola, Tasrif, Shompod, Srinagar, Karnaphuli, Balia and Lali. The condition of internal travels is very good. Road transportation is available between the sub-districts. Sea-truck is used for travelling Monpura sub-district.

Members of the 11th parliament 
The district is divided into four parliamentary constituencies. In the 2018 general election, the Awami League won all four seats.

Points of interest 
 Monpura char
 Char Kukri Mukri
 Deuli
 Dhal Char
 Manpura landing station
 Taruia Seabeach
 Sojib Wazed Joy digital Park
 Sahabazpur gas field
 Jakob Tower
 Nizam-Hasina Foundation Mosque
 Tulatuli

Notable residents 
 Major Hafizuddin Ahmed (Bir Bikrom), politician
 Tofail Ahmed, MP
 Abdullah Al Islam Jakob, MP
 Mostafa Kamal (Bir Sreshtho), freedom fighter in 1971
 Andaleeve Rahman, MP
 Mosharraf Hossain Shahjahan

Notes

References

 
Districts of Bangladesh